Ocampo is one of the 113 municipalities of Michoacán, in central Mexico. The municipal seat lies at Ocampo.

Geography

Towns and villages
The municipality has 42 localities. The largest are:

References

Municipalities of Michoacán